Scrobipalpa povolnyi is a moth in the family Gelechiidae. It was described by Emelyanov and Piskunov in 1982. It is found in Mongolia.

References

Scrobipalpa
Moths described in 1982